Sangaris lezamai is a species of beetle in the family Cerambycidae. It was described by Hovore in 1998. It is known from Costa Rica.

References

lezamai
Beetles described in 1998